Deivid Rodrigo Soares de Macedo (born June 13, 1988 in Carapicuiba, Brazil) is a Brazilian former professional footballer who played as a forward.

Teams
 Rio Preto 2010
 Tupã 2011
 San Marcos de Arica 2012

External links
 
 

1988 births
Living people
People from Carapicuíba
Brazilian footballers
Association football forwards
Rio Preto Esporte Clube players
San Marcos de Arica footballers
Primera B de Chile players
Brazilian expatriate footballers
Brazilian expatriate sportspeople in Chile
Expatriate footballers in Chile